The Central Business District (CBD) is located in central Manama, the capital of Bahrain. Many of the city's hotels, office buildings, shops and restaurants are located in the CBD. It lies along the northern coast of Manama.

The CBD is considered one of the best shopping areas in the city; it has the Manama Souq (market, in Arabic), located near the Bab Al Bahrain (the Gateway of Bahrain). The old souq has a variety of goods, from spices, condiments, textiles, electronics to jewelry.

In addition, the Bahrain World Trade Centre and the Bahrain Financial Harbour; this has Bahrain's tallest towers, and many of the country's largest banks and companies are also situated in the CBD.

Moda Mall Bahrain is a high-end shopping complex in the ground floor of Bahrain World Trade Centre. The Mall has around 160 designer stores, including Louis Vuitton, Christian Dior, Christian Lacroix, Dolce & Gabbana, Fendi, Gucci, Hermés, Kenzo, Stella McCartney, Alexander McQueen, Emporio Armani, Furla, Roberto Cavalli, Vertu, Ermenegildo Zenga, Agent Provocateur, Versace, Bottega Veneta, Escada, Max Mara, Loewe, Mathew Williamson, Valentino, Viktor & Rolf, amongst others. The mall will also house some of the finest jewellery stores such as De Beers, Tiffany & Co., Boucheron, Chopard, Chanel Jewellery, Van Cleef & Arpels and Folli Follie, among others.

See also
 Central business district
 List of tourist attractions in Bahrain
 Culture of Bahrain
 Manama
 List of tallest structures in Bahrain

References

External links
 Bahrain Financial Harbour (BFH)
 Bahrain World Trade Centre (BWTC)

Neighborhoods of Manama
Economy of Bahrain
Tourist attractions in Bahrain
Financial districts